Mitchell College Historic District is a national historic district located at Statesville, Iredell County, North Carolina.  It encompasses 336 contributing buildings  and 1 contributing site associated with Mitchell Community College and the surrounding residential area in Statesville.  The district includes notable examples of Greek Revival, Queen Anne, and Classical Revival architecture dated between about 1885 and 1930. Located in the district is the oldest building and separately listed; the Main Building, Mitchell College (1854-1856). Other notable contributing resources are the Fourth Creek Burying Ground, George Anderson House (c. 1860), Friends Meeting House (c. 1875), Broad St. Methodist Church (1907), Congregation Emmanuel Synagogue (1891), McRorie House (c. 1880), Dr. Tom H. Anderson House (c. 1880), Dr. Julius Lowenstein House (c. 1890), Ludwig Ash House (c. 1910), L. N. Mills House (1925), Mills Apartment (c. 1930), R. A. Cooper House (1920), Statesville Woman's Club (1927), and the former Davis Hospital.

It was listed on the National Register of Historic Places in 1980, with a boundary increase in 2002.

References

Historic districts on the National Register of Historic Places in North Carolina
Greek Revival architecture in North Carolina
Queen Anne architecture in North Carolina
Neoclassical architecture in North Carolina
Geography of Iredell County, North Carolina
National Register of Historic Places in Iredell County, North Carolina